Fred Ellis (17 September 1889 Jackson, Michigan – 1958) was an American racecar driver.

Indy 500 results

References

1889 births
1958 deaths
Indianapolis 500 drivers
Sportspeople from Jackson, Michigan
Racing drivers from Michigan